Madyson Middleton was an 8-year-old girl from Santa Cruz, California whose mother reported her missing from their apartment on July 25, 2015. Middleton had been lured into another apartment where she was strangled to death and disposed of in a dumpster. The suspect was charged two days later and was identified as 15-year-old Adrian Gonzalez after Middleton's body was found.

Suspect 
The suspect was identified as Adrian Gonzalez, who was 15 years old at the time and was charged with Middleton's murder. He confessed to duct-taping her mouth shut and sexually assaulting her before stabbing and strangling her to death. Gonzalez then dumped her body and watched the case closely, even asking random police officers questions about the crime. He also had a unique obsession with yo-yos and writing "suicidal" posts on Instagram.

Trial 
Adrian Gonzalez pleaded not guilty as trial began in November 2017 as there were some controversies to prosecute Gonzalez as an adult because he was only 15 when he committed the murder. 2016 California Proposition 57 law was passed in 2016 where the judge can decide if the accused can be prosecuted as an adult.
In April 2021, Gonzalez was sentenced to juvenile prison where he will be incarcerated until he turns 25 in 2024.

See also
List of kidnappings
List of solved missing person cases

References 

2015 murders in the United States
Deaths by person in California
Deaths by strangulation in the United States
Female murder victims
Formerly missing people
Incidents of violence against girls
Murder in California
Murdered American children
Sexual assaults in the United States